Betta persephone is a species of  labyrinth fish endemic to Malaysia where it is only known from Johor. This betta's specific epithet derives from the Greek goddess Persephone, queen of the Underworld, a reference to the largely blackish colouration of this fish.

Description
Betta persephone is a small species with a maximum length of  SL.  The males are largely blue-black in colour, with the females exhibiting browner tones.

Distribution and habitat
Betta persephone has a limited distribution in Malaysia, the type locality being Ayer Hitam in Johor. This Betta species inhabits soft, acidic waters at temperatures of 23‒28 °C (73‒82 °F). The typical habitat is closed-canopy forest where it is dark on the forest floor and there is thick vegetation on the banks of the blackwater streams and peat swamps where this fish lives among submerged tree roots. Sometimes it may be forced to live temporarily among the wet leaf litter in periods when the peaty pools dry up.

Ecology
In its natural habitat, Betta persephone feeds on insects and other small invertebrates. It is a bubble nester, creating a ball of bubbles among submerged vegetation in which to lay its eggs.

Status
Betta persephone is listed as "Endangered" on the IUCN Red List, as its natural range is restricted to a very small and diminishing area of swampy water bodies in tropical forests. Its habitat is being diminished by the clearing of the forests to make way for oil palm cultivation.  While a delicate species not easily kept in aquaria, it has been bred successfully in captivity.

References

External links
 International Betta Congress Species Maintenance Program photos

persephone
Taxa named by Dieter Schaller (aquarist)
Fish of Southeast Asia
Fish described in 1986